The Australian Joint Stock Bank was a bank in Australia. It operated from 1852 to 1910, after which it became the Australian Bank of Commerce and then was taken over by the Bank of New South Wales in 1931.

History
The Australian Joint Stock Bank was created in 1852 by an Act of the New South Wales Parliament. It issued its first banknotes in 1862.

In 1910, the Australian Bank of Commerce was registered in New South Wales under the Joint Stock Companies Act to take over the Australian Joint Stock Bank. In 1917 it acquired the City Bank of Sydney.

In 1931, the Bank of New South Wales (now Westpac) acquired the Australian Bank of Commerce.

Heritage buildings
Some of the former bank's buildings are now heritage-listed, including:
 Australian Joint Stock Bank Building, Maryborough
 Australian Joint Stock Bank Building, Townsville
 Gympie Stock Exchange (originally built for the Australian Joint Stock Bank) 
Commonwealth Bank Building, Mackay (originally built for the Australian Joint Stock Bank)

References

External links

 
Defunct banks of Australia
Banks established in 1852
1852 establishments in Australia
Banks disestablished in 1910
1910 disestablishments in Australia
1910 mergers and acquisitions